Telos Corporation is an information technology and cybersecurity company located in Ashburn, Virginia. Telos primarily serves government and enterprise clients, receiving a large number of its contracts from the United States Department of Defense. Customers are primarily military, intelligence and civilian agencies of the US government and NATO allies.

History
Telos was founded in 1969 in Santa Monica, California and incorporated in Maryland in 1971.

John B. Wood joined the company in 1992, and became president and chief executive in 1994. Today, Telos is headquartered in Ashburn, Virginia.

On 16 June 2020, Telos Corporation reported its Automated Message Handling System (AMHS) service was granted an additional five years and $15.6 million contract by the Defense Information Systems Agency (DISA).

On 20 May 2020, Telos named retired general Keith B. Alexander as its advisory board's inaugural leader.

In November 2020, the company filed for an initial public offering.

References

1969 establishments in California
Defense companies of the United States
American companies established in 1969
Consulting firms established in 1969
Information technology consulting firms of the United States
Loudoun County, Virginia
2020 initial public offerings
Companies listed on the Nasdaq
Companies based in Virginia